Petronio Franceschini (Bologna, January 9, 1651 – Venice, December 4, 1680) was a Baroque composer from Italy.

Biography
Franceschini studied under Giacomo Antonio Perti and became also the main cellist in Basilica di San Petronio. He produced mainly church music and he is credited with an innovative use of trumpet and voices. In addition, he wrote four operas. He died in Venice before he had the chance to finish a fifth, Dionisio, which was completed by a contemporary of his, Giovanni Domenico Partenio. Today Franceschini's most often performed composition (conceived with San Petronio in mind) is his Sonata in D for two trumpets and strings; this work has been recorded several times since the 1960s.

Works
Le gare di Sdegno, d'Amore e di Gelosia
Oronte de Menfi
Arsinoe
Apollo in Tessaglia
Dioniso ovvero La virtù trionfante del vitio
Sonata for 2 Trumpets in D

External links
Petronio Franceschini at naxos.com

1651 births
1680 deaths
17th-century Italian composers
Italian Baroque composers
Italian opera composers
Italian male classical composers
Male opera composers
Musicians from Bologna
17th-century male musicians